The 335th Fighter Squadron is a United States Air Force unit.   It is assigned to the 4th Operations Group and stationed at Seymour Johnson Air Force Base, North Carolina.

The 335th was constituted on 22 August 1942 as an incorporation of the No. 121 (Eagle) Squadron of the Royal Air Force, formed on 14 May 1941 as the second of three Eagle Squadrons of the Royal Air Force. These squadrons were composed of American volunteers, recruited by the RAF as a result of the heavy loss of pilots during the Battle of Britain in 1940; the volunteers were ineligible to join the USAAF. In this capacity, the squadron operated Supermarine Spitfires and Hawker Hurricanes.

Its current emblem contains the head of an American Indian chief, which dates back to the original emblem of 121 Squadron RAF.

Overview
The "Chiefs" fly the McDonnell-Douglas (now Boeing) F-15E Strike Eagle. The squadron has an authorized strength of 24 aircraft and around 65 personnel.  Its aircraft are identified by the "SJ" tail code and green fin flash.

Currently the squadron provides worldwide deployable aircraft and personnel capable of executing combat missions in support of worldwide Aerospace Expeditionary Force deployments to combat areas as part of the Global War on Terrorism.

The 335th is known as the "World's Leading MiG Killers" for destroying 218.5 MiGs in aerial combat.

History

World War II

In 1942, the Royal Air Force Eagle Squadrons were turned over to the United States Army Air Forces, with No. 121 Squadron being constituted as the 335th Fighter Squadron on 22 August, activated on 12 September and the same day assigned to the 4th Fighter Group of the VIII Fighter Command.  Coming into USAAF service, the squadron was re-equipped with Republic P-47 Thunderbolts and later North American P-51 Mustangs. They destroyed 262 enemy aircraft – 165 in the air and 97 on the ground.

They remained with the group until they were returned to the United States and inactivated at Camp Kilmer, New Jersey on 10 November 1945.

1940s
After less than a year, the 335th was reactivated on 9 September 1946 at Selfridge Field, Michigan, and has remained on active duty since. In 1947, the squadron was redesignated as the 335th Fighter Squadron, Jet Propelled, as it received the new Lockheed P-80 Shooting Stars.

They flew out of Andrews Air Force Base, Maryland, until 1949, when they moved to Langley Air Force Base, Virginia and received the North American F-86 Sabre.

1950s 

On 10 November 1950 they took their Sarbes to Korea as the 335th Fighter-Interceptor Squadron of the Fifth Air Force. By the end of the Korean War, the 335th led all squadrons with 218.5 kills (for around forty losses) and had become a part of the "MiG Killer" legend with 12 aces.

The 335th remained in the Far East until 8 December 1957, when they moved to their current base at Seymour Johnson Air Force Base, North Carolina, and converted to the North American F-100 Super Sabre.

In May 1958, the squadron deployed to Eglin Air Force Base, Florida, tasked with operational testing of the new Republic F-105 Thunderchief for the next three years. In May 1959, the 335th became the first squadron in the Air Force to receive the F-105 Thunderchief, and the transition from F-100s to F-105s began. The squadron returned to Seymour Johnson AFB in November 1961.

1960s

The squadron saw action in Southeast Asia in November 1965, flying the F-105 out of Takhli Royal Thai Air Force Base, Thailand. In 1969, the 335th transitioned to the airframe its aircrew would fly for the next twenty-three years—the McDonnell F-4 Phantom II; later this year, they briefly deployed to South Korea.

1970s 
In 1972, the squadron again saw action in Vietnam, from July to December, flying out of Ubon Royal Thai Air Force Base, Thailand.

Later in the 1970s, they became the first operational squadron to qualify with the GBU-15 guided bomb, and in doing so, exceeded 100,000 consecutive accident-free hours. They deployed briefly to Ramstein Air Base, Germany in 1978 and 1979, for a month each time.

1990s
On 1 March 1990, in conjunction with the fifty-first change of command, the squadron's final F-4 sortie and first McDonnell Douglas F-15E Strike Eagle sortie were flown. The 335th was the second fighter squadron in the Air Force to receive the Strike Eagle.

On 27 December 1990, the 335th deployed twenty-four F-15Es along with support personnel and equipment to Al Kharj Air Base in central Saudi Arabia. On the night of 16 January 1991, the 335th participated in the initial assault on Iraq, hitting communications, power networks, and airfields around Baghdad. The 335th made aerial warfare history by downing an Iraqi helicopter in the air using a laser-guided bomb. During the war, the squadron flew 1,097 combat missions over Iraq and occupied Kuwait, dropping over 4.8 million pounds of ordnance.

After the war, the 335th continued to fly combat air patrol missions over Iraq and Kuwait until relieved by the 334th Fighter Squadron, departing on 24 June 1991. Since then, the 335th has returned to Southwest Asia several times; three times to Dhahran, Saudi Arabia, and twice to Doha, Qatar, as an Air Expeditionary Force. On 13 January 1993, the ten F-15Es from the 335th took part in a night strike on Air Defence targets inside Southern Iraq as part of Operation Southern Watch. The AEF-III deployment in 1996 was the first for an Air Force unit to Doha after the Desert Storm deployment of the 614th Tactical Fighter Squadron's F-16's during 1990–1991.

2000s
In January 2002, the 335th deployed to Al Jaber Air Base, Kuwait in support of Southern Watch and Operation Enduring Freedom. 12 F-15Es deployed, accomplishing 500 sorties comprising 3,000 flying hours. During this time the 335th dropped almost 300 laser guided and dumb bombs, and expended 1200 rounds of 20mm ammunition. The 335th received numerous awards and accolades from Operation Enduring Freedom; four Silver Stars were awarded as well as eight Distinguished Flying Crosses.

In February 2003 the 335th again deployed to Southwest Asia for Operation Iraqi Freedom. During Iraqi Freedom and Operation Southern Watch the squadron deployed 24 F-15Es, and flew 1,500 sorties, totaling 7,000 flying hours. They dropped over 1 million pounds of precision and non-precision munitions on numerous targets such as key Iraqi leadership, command and control bunkers, artillery Republican Guard units and many others.

F-15E serial 89-487, known as "America's Jet", has the most hours of any F-15E, and it has 2 air to air kills (of the 3 total by F-15Es).

Lineage
 Constituted as the 335th Fighter Squadron on 22 August 1942
 Activated on 12 September 1942
 Redesignated 335th Fighter Squadron, Single Engine on 20 August 1943
 Inactivated on 10 November 1945
 Activated on 9 September 1946
 Redesignated 335th Fighter Squadron, Jet Propelled on 23 April 1947
 Redesignated 335th Fighter Squadron, Jet on 14 June 1948
 Redesignated 335th Fighter-Interceptor Squadron on 20 January 1950
 Redesignated 335th Fighter-Bomber Squadron on 8 March 1955
 Redesignated 335th Fighter-Day Squadron on 25 April 1956
 Redesignated 335th Tactical Fighter Squadron on 1 July 1958
 Redesignated 335th Fighter Squadron on 1 November 1991

Assignments
 4th Fighter Group, 12 September 1942 – 10 November 1945
 4th Fighter Group (later 4th Fighter-Interceptor Group, 4th Fighter-Bomber Group, 4th Fighter-Day Group), 9 September 1946
 4th Fighter-Day Wing (later 4th Tactical Fighter Wing), 8 December 1957
 Attached to Tactical Air Command 1 May 1960 – 22 November 1961, Seventeenth Air Force c. 16 November 1964 – 21 February 1965, 6441 Tactical Fighter Wing 3 July–c. 6 November 1965, 355th Tactical Fighter Wing c. 6 November–6 December 1965, 354th Tactical Fighter Wing 4 December 1969 – c. 25 May 1970, 8th Tactical Fighter Wing 6 July–, 22 December 1972, 86th Tactical Fighter Wing 2 September–2 October 1978 and 28 August–29 September 1979, 4th Tactical Fighter Wing, Provisional, 27 December 1990 – 12 March 1991, 4404th Tactical Fighter Wing, Provisional after 13 March 1991)
 4th Operations Group, 22 April 1991 – present (remained attached to 4404th Tactical Fighter Wing, Provisional until 27 June 1991)

Stations

 RAF Bushey Hall (AAF-341), England, 12 September 1942
 RAF Debden (AAF-356), England, 29 September 1942
 RAF Steeple Morden (AAF-122), England, c. 23 July–4 November 1945
 Camp Kilmer, New Jersey, 9–10 November 1945
 Selfridge Field, Michigan, 9 September 1946
 Andrews Field (later Andrews Air Force Base), Maryland, 26 March 1947
 Langley Air Force Base, Virginia, 1 May 1949
 Dover Air Force Base, Delaware, 13 August–11 November 1950
 Johnson Air Base, Japan, 13 December 1950
 Suwon Air Base (K-13), South Korea, 1 May 1951
 Kimpo Air Base (K-14), South Korea, 24 August 1951
 Johnson Air Base, Japan, 20 September 1951
 Kimpo Air Base (K-14), South Korea, 4 November 1951

 Chitose Air Base, Japan, c. 26 November 1954 – 8 December 1957
 Seymour Johnson Air Force Base, North Carolina, 8 December 1957 – present
 Operated from
 Eglin Air Force Base, Florida, 1 May 1960 – 22 November 1961
 McCoy Air Force Base, Florida, 21 October–29 November 1962
 Incirlik Air Base, Turkey, 16 November 1964 – 21 February 1965
 Yokota Air Base, Japan, 3 July–c. 6 November 1965
 Takhli Royal Thai Air Force Base, Thailand, c. 6 November–c. 8 December 1965
 Kunsan Air Base, South Korea, 24 December 1967 – c. 25 June 1968
 Ubon Royal Thai Air Force Base, Thailand, 6 July–22 December 1972
 Ramstein Air Base, Germany, 2 September–2 October 1978 and 28 August–29 September 1979
 Al Karj Air Base, Saudi Arabia, 27 December 1990 – 24 June 1991

Aircraft

 Supermarine Spitfire, 1942–1943
 Republic P-47 Thunderbolt, 1943–1944; 1947
 North American P-51 (later F-51) Mustang, 1944–1945, 1948–1949
 Lockheed P-80 Shooting Star, 1947–1949
 North American F-86 Sabre, 1949–1958
 North American F-100 Super Sabre, 1958–1960
 Republic F-105 Thunderchief, 1959–1966
 McDonnell F-4 Phantom II, 1967–1989
 McDonnell Douglas F-15E Strike Eagle, 1990–present

Emblems

References

 Notes

 Citations

Bibliography

External links
 "4th Fighter Group WWII" Official WWII Association Website Referenced 4 March 2012
 a U.S. Air Force website

Fighter squadrons of the United States Air Force
Military units and formations in North Carolina
Fighter squadrons of the United States Army Air Forces